Newcastle Emlyn Urban District was an urban district in Carmarthenshire from 1894 to 1974. It has since been replaced by Carmarthen.

References 
Archives

Carmarthenshire
Urban districts of Wales
Newcastle Emlyn